Avenue Charles-de-Gaulle is an avenue in Neuilly-sur-Seine, Paris, France, named after Charles de Gaulle.

The avenue forms part of the Route nationale 13. Until 1971, it was called Avenue de Neuilly, a rare case in France where the road bears the name of the commune in which it is found. Avenue Charles-de-Gaulle continues along Paris's axe historique, which stretches from the original Palais des Tuileries to Porte Maillot, and which finishes at Pont de Neuilly. It forms a segment of the axe majeur, which links Paris and La Défense. It is used by a daily flow of 160,000 vehicles.

This was due to the completion of the couverture Madrid.

References

External links
 

1971 establishments in France
Avenues (landscape) in Paris
Neuilly-sur-Seine
Charles de Gaulle